The Swedish National Board of Forensic Medicine (abbreviated RMV) is a Swedish government agency organized under the Ministry of Justice, responsible for forensic psychiatry, forensic chemistry, forensic medicine and forensic genetics. The agency headquarters responsible for coordination, planning, regulation and control is located in Stockholm; overseeing a number of forensic departments in Gothenburg, Uppsala, Umeå, Lund and Linköping.

See also

Ministry of Justice (Sweden)
Swedish National Forensic Centre

References

External links
Swedish National Board of Forensic Medicine - Official Site (English)

Law enforcement agencies of Sweden
Forensics organizations
Medical and health organizations based in Sweden